Sony Movies may refer to:

 Sony Movies (United States TV channel), formerly Sony Movie Channel
 Sony Movies (British and Irish TV channel), free-to-air channel showing films and related content
 Sony Movies (Latin American TV channel), Latin American pay television channel

See also 
 Sony Pictures, American entertainment company